Will Sierakowski (born 26 July 1990) is an Australian rules footballer who played for the North Melbourne Football Club in the Australian Football League (AFL). He was traded, in exchange for draft pick No. 58, from the Hawthorn Football Club in the 2011 Trade Week after being on the rookie list for three years, but not making his AFL debut.  He is the nephew of former  premiership player Brian Sierakowski and the cousin of former  and St Kilda's David Sierakowski.

In Round 6 of the 2013 AFL season Sierakowski made his AFL debut for North Melbourne against Port Adelaide.
He was delisted at the end of 2013 after playing seven games that season.

After leaving  Sierakowski moved north and played for the Sydney University Football Club in the NEAFL.

References

External links

Living people
1990 births
Box Hill Football Club players
Australian rules footballers from New South Wales
North Melbourne Football Club players
Werribee Football Club players
Sydney University Australian National Football Club players
Australian people of Polish descent